The Bay Town Trolley is the primary provider of mass transportation in Bay County, Florida. The system is referred to as a trolley service, because most of the buses in the agency's fleets are designed in the style of tourist trolleys. In 2009, the agency expanded from provided weekday-only to Monday-Saturday service all year round. Previously, buses only ran on Saturdays during the peak tourist season.

Routes
1 Downtown
2 City Hall/Callaway
3 Panama City Mall
4 City Hall/Community College
5 Panama City Mall/Community College via 23rd St
6 Panama City Mall/Community College via 16th St
7 Lyndell

References
Bay Town Trolley

Panama City, Florida
Bus transportation in Florida